Göktaş (literally "sky stone", i. e. "meteor"; "meteorite") is a Turkish surname formed by the combination of the two Turkish words gök ("sky") and taş ("stone; rock") and may refer to:

 Emre Vefa Göktaş (born 2001), Turkish karateka
 İsmail Özgür Göktaş (born 1989), Turkish footballer 
 Mustafa Levent Göktaş (born 1959), Turkish colonel

See also
 Göktaş, Azdavay, a village in Turkey
 Göktaş, Tercan

References

Turkish-language surnames